This is a list of Bien de Interés Cultural landmarks in the Province of Salamanca, Spain.

 Church of Sancti Spiritus
 Cathedral of Santa María (Ciudad Rodrigo)

References 

 
Salamanca